Shahidabad (also Romanized as Shahīdābād) also known as Toroujen is a village in Kuhestan Rural District, in the Central District of Behshahr County, Mazandaran Province, Iran. At the 2016 census, its population was 4,113, in 1,336 families.

Hotu and Kamarband Caves are located in this village.

References 

Populated places in Behshahr County